Joseph "Henry" Persons (January 30, 1834 – June 17, 1910) was an American politician, lawyer and soldier.

Early life
Persons was born near Smarrs, Georgia, in Monroe County; however, his family moved to Talbot County, Georgia in 1836. He attended the University of Georgia (UGA) in Athens and graduated with a Bachelor of Arts degree in 1855.

Civil War
During the American Civil War, Persons served as a cavalry captain in the Third Georgia regiment of the Confederate States Army.

Postbellum
After the war, he was elected as a Representative to the 46th United States Congress as an Independent Democrat. Persons lost his bid for re-election in 1880 and returned to Geneva, Georgia. He studied law, gained admittance to the state bar in 1885 and began practicing law in Talbotton, Georgia.

After his political service, Persons served as a UGA trustee from 1894 until 1910. He died that year in Talbotton and was buried in that city's Rose Hill Cemetery.

References
 Retrieved on 2009-04-16
 History of the University of Georgia, Thomas Walter Reed,  Imprint:  Athens, Georgia : University of Georgia, ca. 1949, p.588

1834 births
1910 deaths
Confederate States Army officers
Georgia (U.S. state) lawyers
Members of the United States House of Representatives from Georgia (U.S. state)
People of Georgia (U.S. state) in the American Civil War
University of Georgia alumni
People from Talbot County, Georgia
Georgia (U.S. state) Democrats
Georgia (U.S. state) Independents
Independent Democrat members of the United States House of Representatives
American slave owners
19th-century American politicians
19th-century American lawyers